was a Japanese voice actor from Osaka Prefecture who worked for Aoni Production.

Death
Tanaka died on October 10, 2016, from intracerebral hemorrhage.

Filmography

Television animation
Sailor Moon (1992) (various minor roles)
Dragon Ball Z (1993) (Caroni)
Marmalade Boy (1994) (Tsutomu Rokutanda)
Turn A Gundam (1999) (Bruno)
Planetes (2003) (Hachirota "Hachimaki" Hoshino)
Rockman EXE Stream (2005) (Rat)
Haikyū!! (2014) (Keishin Ukai)
Marvel Disk Wars: The Avengers (2015) (Baron Blood)
Sailor Moon Crystal (2015) (Achiral)

Unknown date
Air Gear (Inuyama)
Air Master (Yashiki Shun)
Bleach (Abirama Redder)
Bobobo-bo Bo-bobo (Wonk)
Brave 10 (Miyoshi Seikai Nyuudou)
Code Geass (Shinichirō Tamaki)
Dragoon Might (Reggie, Drake, Sarumaru)
Gintama (Katoken)
Green Green (Tadatomo "Bacchi-Gu" Ijūin)
Hoshin Engi (Ko Hiko)
InuYasha (Genbu)
Kaiser Knuckle (known outside Japan as Global Champion) (J.McCoy)
Konjiki no Gash Bell!! (Hiroshi Yamanaka)
Magical Girl Pretty Sammy (Boss)
Mobile Suit Gundam SEED (Orson White)
One Piece (Talaran, Avalo Pizarro, Brownbeard, Manboshi, Blackback, Yomo)
Shining Tears X Wind (Enu)
SD Gundam Sangokuden Brave Battle Warriors (Touton Memedorza)
Yaiba (Gerozaemon, Kendo Student, Hakki)
Shippu! Iron Leaguer (Additional Voices)

Original video animation
I Shall Never Return (1994) (Kazuyoshi Iwasaki)
Blue Submarine No. 6 (1998) (Akihiro Ookawa)
Mobile Suit Gundam MS IGLOO (2004) (Jackson)
Nasu: A Migratory Bird with Suitcase (2007) (Dagdag)

Theatrical animation
Mobile Suit Gundam :Special edition (2000) (Oscar Dublin)
Mobile Suit Gundam: Soldiers of Sorrow :Special edition (2000) (Oscar Dublin)
Mobile Suit Gundam: Encounters in Space :Special edition (2000) (Oscar Dublin)
Doraemon: Nobita and the Windmasters (2003) (Wind Guide A)
Rainbow Fireflies (2011) (Setsuko's father)

Tokusatsu
Mirai Sentai Timeranger (2000) (Hitman Mad Blast (ep. 5))
Hyakujuu Sentai Gaoranger (2001) (Freezer Org (ep. 13))

Video games
Tobal 2 (1997) (Hom)
Silhouette Mirage (1997) (Grigori Shemhazai)
Metal Gear Acid 2 (2005) (Harab Serap)
Bladestorm: The Hundred Years' War (2007) (Jean)
Shining Wind (2007) (Enu)
Last Escort 2 (2008) (Kouki)
Code 18 (2011) (Takeshi Fujii)
Yakuza 0 (2015) (Wen Hai Lee)
JoJo's Bizarre Adventure: Eyes of Heaven (2015) (Tamami Kobayashi)
Persona 5 (2016) (Junya Kaneshiro)

Drama CDs
Daisuki (xxxx) (Masayoshi Ikeda)
Hanayome wa Yoru ni Chiru (xxxx) (Wakana)

Dubbing Roles

Live-action
American Pie Presents: The Naked Mile (Mike "Cooze" Coozeman (Jake Siegel))
Painkiller Jane (Riley Jensen (Sean Owen Roberts))
The Recruit (Ronnie Gibson (Mike Realba))

Animation
Brother Bear 2 (Kenai)
South Park: Bigger, Longer & Uncut (Mole)

References

External links
Kazunari Tanaka at Ryu's Seiyuu Infos

1967 births
2016 deaths
Male voice actors from Osaka Prefecture
Japanese male voice actors
Osaka University of Arts alumni
Aoni Production voice actors